The  took place from January to February 1573, between the forces of the Takeda clan, led by the noted warlord Takeda Shingen, against the Tokugawa clan, led by Tokugawa Ieyasu. Along with the Battle of Mikatagahara it was one of the final battles in Takeda Shingen's long career.

Background
Encouraged by his victory over the Tokugawa at the Battle of Mikatagahara in neighboring Tōtōmi Province, Takeda Shingen decided to push farther into Mikawa Province, hopefully opening a route to the capital, Kyoto. Leading a mixed cavalry and infantry force of 30,000 men, Shingen skirted the northern shore of Lake Hamana before advancing inland into Mikawa. His route was opposed by approximately 500 defenders of Noda Castle, situated on the Toyokawa river, commanded by Suganuma Sadamichi. Shingen was confident in his strength of numbers, and in his knowledge that the Tokugawa forces were overextended in various campaigns. Furthermore, his forces had taken Noda Castle with ease during a reconnaissance-in-force two years earlier.

The battle
Suganuma had extensively increased the defensive capabilities of Noda Castle over the past two years with additional earthworks and a wooden palisade.

However, Shingen's kanabori-shū (sapper corps, composed of troops with mining experience) tunneled into the castle moat, draining it and depriving the defenders of their drinking water as well as their primary defense.

Shingen extended an offer to spare the lives of the rank-and-file troops provided that Suganuma surrender on February 16.

Though the castle's surrender was now imminent, Shingen let his guard down when he approached the castle, and a sniper shot him.

Aftermath
Following the surrender of Noda Castle, Tokugawa forces were in retreat throughout Mikawa, and even Tokugawa Ieyasu’s stronghold of Okazaki Castle was threatened. However, Takeda Shingen died in May 1573 (whether from illness or from the wound sustained at the Battle of Noda Castle), and his forces were unable to maintain their momentum under his successor, Takeda Katsuyori.

References

Sadler, A.L. The Maker of Modern Japan, the Life of Shogun Tokugawa Ieyasu. George Allen & Unwin (London) 1937 
Turnbull, Stephen. The Samurai Sourcebook. London: Cassell & Co. (1998).

Noda
Noda
1573 in Japan
Conflicts in 1573